Indrek Martinson (1937– 14 November 2009) was an Estonian-born Swedish physicist.

In 1971 he defended his doctoral thesis at Stockholm University. He taught at Lund University (Emeritus Professor).

His main field of research was accelerator-based atomic physics.

Awards
 2001: Order of the White Star, IV class.

References

1937 births
2009 deaths
Swedish physicists
Members of the Royal Swedish Academy of Sciences
Fellows of the American Physical Society